New Wave! is an album by Dizzy Gillespie consisting of live and studio performances, recorded in 1962 and released on the Philips label in 1963.

Reception

In his DownBeat magazine review of March 14, 1963, jazz critic Don DeMichael wrote that "Dizzy plays marvelously on this record... There's a spirit evident that is all too often missing from today's record sessions – a spirit of vivacious humor and playing-for-the-hell-of-it."

The AllMusic review states: "this was one of Dizzy Gillespie's finest sessions of the 1960s... Highly recommended."

Track listing
 "In a Shanty in Old Shanty Town"		 
 "Careless Love" 		 
 "Chega de Saudade" 		 
 "Taboo" 		 
 "Gee Baby Ain't I Good to You"		 
 "One Note Samba" 		 
 "Manhã de Carnaval"
 "Pergunte ao Joao"

Personnel

 Tracks 1, 2, 5:
Dizzy Gillespie - trumpet
Leo Wright - alto sax, flute
Lalo Schifrin - piano
Bola Sete - guitar
Chris White - bass
Rudy Collins - drums
Jose Paula - guitar, tamb, perc, vcl
Carmen Costa - vcl, maracas

Recorded: New York City, July 1962

 Track 6:
Dizzy Gillespie - trumpet
Leo Wright - alto sax, flute
Lalo Schifrin - piano
Elek Bacsik - guitar
Chris White - bass
Rudy Collins - drums
Pepito Riestra - percussion

Recorded: Juan-les-Pins, France, July, 1962

 Tracks 3, 4, 7, 8:
Dizzy Gillespie - trumpet
Leo Wright - alto sax, flute
Charlie Ventura - tenor sax, bass sax
Lalo Schifrin - piano
Chris White - bass
Rudy Collins - drums
Jose Paula - guitar, tambourine, percussion, vocals
Carmen Costa - cabasa, güiro, vocals

Recorded: New York City, May 1962

References

External links
Dizzy Gillespie - Discography at University of Idaho library

1962 albums
Dizzy Gillespie albums
Philips Records albums